Hooked (foaled 30 October 2010) is an Australian Thoroughbred racehorse.

On 25 October 2014, he won the Crystal Mile.

Background

Hooked is a 4 year old bay stallion from Australia, owned by Sean Buckley and trained by John P Thompson, based at Randwick. He is sired by the stallion Casino Prince out of the dam Absolute Lure.

Racing career

On 25th Oct 2014 at Moonee Valley, Hooked was ridden by Craig Williams and scored his most significant win to date, getting the money in the $200,000 Schweppes Crystal Mile, defeating Bull Point.

Hooked recorded a time of 1:34.98, falling just short of Cabeza’s benchmark of 1:34.78 seconds.

Craig Williams pushed Hooked forward from barrier one and settled on the tail of leader Havana Rey before surging clear before the bend and holding off the fast-finishing Bull Point and Desert Jeuney.

On Saturday 5 September 2015, Hooked won the Tramway Stakes 1400m Group 2 race at Royal Randwick Racecourse with jockey Tye Angland, winning prize money of $107,000.

On Saturday 15 April 2017, Hooked won the 1400m Group 3 mypunter.com Victoria Handicap with jockey Luke Nolan.

References

Racehorses bred in Australia
2010 racehorse births